Nna Thaan Case Kodu is a 2022 Indian Malayalam-language satire film written and directed by Ratheesh Balakrishnan Poduval, produced by Santhosh T. Kuruvilla and co-produced by Kunchacko Boban Productions and Udaya Pictures. The film stars Kunchacko Boban and Gayathrie Shankar. The music was composed by Dawn Vincent. The story revolves around Kozhummal Rajeevan, a reformed thief's fight for justice when an innocent act to defend himself places him in loggerheads with the high and mighty of society.

Nna Thaan Case Kodu was released theatrically on 11 August 2022 opened to highly positive reviews for its humour, screenplay, direction & performances.
The film become commercially successful in box office.

Plot 

Petty thief Kozhummal Rajeevan meets Devi, a Tamil labourer, and falls for her. They decide to live together at her house and he completely stops his illegal activities and starts working as a labourer. One day, on his way back from a temple festival, to avoid being hit by an auto, he jumps over the boundary wall of an MLAs house and gets bitten by the MLA’s pet dogs. To top it off, he is accused of theft and arrested.

In court, Rajeevan argues his case by himself with the help of police-turned-advocate he knows, and promises to produce evidence. Thereafter the court proceedings start and Rajeevan drags the PWD minister into the situation by accusing him for the one pothole on the road that caused all the problems. Will he be able to prove himself innocent or will he be oppressed forms the rest of the plot.

Cast

Production

Development 
The film was announced on 14 March 2022 by Kunchacko Boban along with a poster on social media, he also revealed that he would be co-producing the film, written and directed by Ratheesh Balakrishnan Poduval. Poduval had earlier tried to cast Boban in his directorial debut Android Kunjappan Version 5.25 (2019), but Boban turned down the role citing that the story was unclear to him. After its release, Boban liked the film and called Poduval and expressed interest for future collaborations. The story of Nna Thaan Case Kodu was discussed with Boban prior to the Covid-19 pandemic in India, it underwent further development after that.

Casting 
For the character, Boban had tanned skin, oiled down hairstyle, and prosthetics on lower jaw. He used Kasargode dialect for the role. Tamil actress Gayathrie Shankar was cast in an important role, and Rajesh Madhavan also plays a supporting role. The rest of the cast was made up of several newcomers who were chosen through auditions.

Music 

The soundtrack album features two songs composed, programmed, and arranged by Dawn Vincent with lyrics penned by Vaishakh Sugunan. The first song "Aadalodakam" was released on 11 July 2022 on YouTube. Second song from the album titled "Padakkoppila" was released on 4 September 2022.
 

The movie features a remix version of yesteryear song Devadoothar Padi from the movie Kathodu Kathoram. The music video was released on Millennium Audios' YouTube channel on 25th July 2022.

Originally composed by Ouseppachan, The music video featuring lead actor Kunchacko Boban’s delectably humorous dance sequence as a typical malayali drunkard often seen during a stage show in a local festival of kerala, became trending on YouTube and was an instant hit after on release.

Release

Theatrical
The release date was revealed through a poster featuring a newspaper article about a robber who was injured by a dog while attempting to steal into an MLA home. The film was released on theatres on 11 August 2022.

Home media
The digital rights of the film is acquired by Disney+ Hotstar and started streaming from 8 September 2022 on the occasion of Thiruvonam. The satellite rights of the film is owned by Asianet. The film premiered on 25 December 2022 on occasion of Christmas.

Reception
For Firstpost, film critic Anna M. M. Vetticad ranked it fifth in her year-end list of best Malayalam films.

References

External links